Positively Somewhere is the second album by Jennifer Paige, released in 2001. The album's title came from a line of her cover of Bardot's song "These Days" ("These days, I don't think twice, I walk on ice, and I'm positively somewhere"). The tracks "Here With Me" and "Stranded" both are covers of songs by Plumb, from the album candycoatedwaterdrops, and "Way of the World" is a cover of the song by Don Philip from his 2000 debut album Don Philip. "Make Me" was originally recorded in 1999-2000 by Solid HarmoniE for their cancelled album Two, which was eventually remastered and released in 2022.

Track listing
"These Days" (Phil Thornalley / Colin Campsie) (Bardot cover)
"Here with Me" (Matt Bronleewe / Tiffany Arbuckle Lee / Thad Beaty / Matt Stanfield) (Plumb cover)
"Stranded" (Matt Bronleewe / Tiffany Arbuckle Lee) (Plumb cover)
"Make Me" (Andy Goldmark / Mark Mueller)
"Way of the World" (Mark Hammond / Robin Scoffield) (Don Philip cover)
"Not This Time" (Jennifer Paige / Lars Halvor Jensen / Martin Michael Larsson / Kim Bullard)
"You Get Through" (Jennifer Paige / Russ DeSalvo / Arnold Michel Roman)
"Feel So Far Away" (Chance Scoggins)
"The Edge" (Jennifer Paige / Trina Harmon / Kasia Livingston)
"Tell Me When" (Jennifer Paige / Christopher Ward / Steve Booker)
"Stay the Night" (Jennifer Paige / Andy Goldmark / Andreas Carlsson)
"Vapor" (West / Lloyd)

Bonus Tracks:
"While You Were Gone"
"Saturday Girl"
"Things Are Looking Up"

Singles
"These Days" - March 6, 2002
"Stranded" - June 17, 2002

Charts

References

2001 albums
Jennifer Paige albums
Hollywood Records albums
Contemporary R&B albums by American artists